Muley Point is a remote cliff and scenic overlook in southern Utah near Mexican Hat in San Juan County, Utah. The view provides panoramic vistas of the desert landscape of southern Utah (Valley of the Gods) and northern Arizona. Monument Valley is visible in the distance while the San Juan River cuts into the canyon below.

References

Landforms of San Juan County, Utah
Tourist attractions in San Juan County, Utah
Cliffs of the United States